Paolo Conte (born 6 January 1937) is an Italian singer, pianist, songwriter and lawyer known for his distinctly grainy, resonant voice. His compositions fuse Italian and Mediterranean sounds with jazz, boogie and elements of the French  and Latin-American rhythms.

Career
Conte was born in Asti, Piedmont. His parents were avid jazz fans and Conte and his younger brother Giorgio spent their formative years listening to a lot of early jazz and blues recordings. After obtaining a law degree at the University of Parma, Conte started working as an assistant solicitor with his father, simultaneously pursuing his musical studies. He learned to play the trombone, the vibraphone and the piano, and formed a jazz band with his brother on guitar. Conte's skill for composing music and original arrangements was noted by music producer Lilli Greco, who paired Conte with lyricist Vito Pallavicini. They wrote songs for Adriano Celentano ("Azzurro", 1968), Caterina Caselli ("Insieme a te non ci sto più", 1968), Fausto Leali ("Deborah", 1968) and Enzo Jannacci ("Messico e nuvole", 1970). In 1974 Conte recorded his first album, Paolo Conte. The following year, he released another eponymous album. Following a series of well-received shows at Club Tenco in Sanremo in 1976 and the commercial success of his third album, 'Un gelato al limon', Conte concentrated almost exclusively on his solo career.

Some of Conte's most popular songs have been used as film soundtracks, including "Come Di" in I Am David (2003) and Mickey Blue Eyes (1999), "Via con me" in French Kiss (1995), Mostly Martha (2001) and Welcome to Collinwood (2002). In addition, Conte's song "L’orchestrina" is featured during the end credits for episodes 3 and 4 of the television series The New Pope (2020). In 1997 Conte won the Nastro d'Argento for Best Score for the film La freccia azzurra.

Awards
On 24 March 1999, Conte was awarded the Knight Grand Cross of the Order of Merit of the Italian Republic, by President Giorgio Napolitano for his "outstanding cultural achievements".
On 15 May 2001, France ordered Paolo Conte Chevalier dans l'Ordre des Arts et des Lettres. In 2015, Conte was awarded the Premio Galileo for contemporary music in Padua.

Conte has also received several honorary doctorates, including one from the University of Macerata (1990).

Discography

Studio albums
 Paolo Conte (1974)
 Paolo Conte (1975)
 Un gelato al limon (1979)
 Paris milonga (1981)
 Appunti di viaggio (1982)
 Paolo Conte (1984)
 Aguaplano (1987, double album - the Japanese and German releases were issued as two separate albums, the second titled Jimmy Ballando in 1989)
 Parole d'amore scritte a macchina (1990)
 900 (1992)
 Una faccia in prestito (1995)
 Razmataz (2000)
 Elegia (2004)
 Psiche (2008)
 Nelson (2010)
 Snob (2014)
 Amazing Game (2016)

Live albums
 Concerti (1985)
 Paolo Conte Live (1988)
 Paolo Conte - Haris Alexiou (1990) 
 Tournée (1993)
 Tournée 2 (1998)
 Paolo Conte Live Arena di Verona (2005)
 Live in Caracalla – 50 Years of Azzurro (2018)

Greatest Hits albums
 Come Di (1986, French release)
 Collezione (1988)
 Boogie (1990)
 Wanda, stai seria con la faccia ma però (1992)
 The Best of Paolo Conte (1996)
 Reveries (2003)
 Wonderful (2006)
 Gong-oh (2011)
 The Platinum Collection (2014)

See also
 2008: Ohrožený druh (featuring ""Jak se ten chlap na mě dívá" by Conte)

References

External links

  Paolo Conte's website
 Biography of Paolo Conte at Swonderful.net

1937 births
Living people
Italian male singers
Italian singer-songwriters
Italian jazz pianists
Italian male pianists
20th-century Italian musicians
21st-century Italian musicians
People from Asti
David di Donatello winners
Nastro d'Argento winners
21st-century pianists
20th-century Italian male musicians
21st-century Italian male musicians
Male jazz musicians
Jazz vibraphonists